Nokhvodabad (also Romanized as Nokhvodābād; also known as Nokhodābād) is a village in Almalu Rural District, Nazarkahrizi District, Hashtrud County, East Azerbaijan Province, Iran. At the 2006 census, its population was 594, in 102 families.

References 

Towns and villages in Hashtrud County